Karam Rasul (born 17 May 1911, date of death unknown) was an Indian wrestler. He competed in the men's freestyle middleweight at the 1936 Summer Olympics.

References

External links
 

1911 births
Year of death missing
Indian male sport wrestlers
Olympic wrestlers of India
Wrestlers at the 1936 Summer Olympics
Place of birth missing